Stranger than Fiction is the fourth album by singer-songwriter, Ultra Nate. This album was released in the USA on April 24, 2001, on the label, Strictly Rhythm after already released in 2000 in Europe and Japan.

Overview
This is a concept album where each song is like the chapters of a novel. The album also expands beyond her House music repertoire, exploring disco, soul, jazz, folk, and pop rock. Includes the hit singles, "Desire", "Get It Up (The Feeling)" (both No. 1 club hits), "I Don't Understand It", and "Twisted". The Japanese import version of this album includes two bonus tracks, "Runaway" and a rendition of the Bee Gees hit, "How Deep Is Your Love".

Track listing

References

External links
Discogs: Stranger than Fiction

2001 albums
Ultra Naté albums
Pop rock albums by American artists
Tribal house albums
Concept albums